Empire Airlines was a regional airline serving the Northeastern United States beginning in 1976. In 1985, the airline was purchased by Piedmont Airlines, which itself was later purchased by USAir, and whose name then lived on in the US Airways Express network before US Airways was merged into American Airlines in 2015.

Founded by Paul Quackenbush, Empire Airlines began with its hub at the Oneida County Airport serving Utica and Rome, New York. Much of its early growth came by picking up routes abandoned by Allegheny Airlines as they concentrated on service to larger cities. Empire expanded throughout the early 1980s to destinations in the Northeast and Mid-Atlantic states.

For a time, Empire aircraft also provided connecting passenger feeder service as a "banner carrier" for Pan American World Airways (Pan Am) operating as Pan Am Express at New York–JFK International Airport (JFK). In early 1983, Empire was operating Pan Am Express service with Fokker F28 twin jets between New York-JFK and Buffalo, Ithaca, Rochester, Syracuse and Utica/Rome in New York; Pan Am was operating an international and domestic passenger hub at JFK at the time.

Toward the end of its existence Empire announced plans to phase out its Swearingen Metro II turboprop fleet and become an all-jet regional airline.  Coinciding with this was a decision to reduce their presence in Utica and relocate their headquarters and most of their operations to Syracuse Hancock International Airport (SYR) which also served as a hub for the airline.

History
Empire was founded in the 1975 as Oneida County Aviation, a small carrier based in Utica. After the passage of the Airline Deregulation Act in 1978, the airline saw potential to grow a hub operation at larger nearby Syracuse using a fleet of 80-seat Fokker F28 Fellowship twin jets and smaller 19-seat Swearingen Metro II propjets. Empire acquired additional F28s from Philadelphia-based Altair Airlines after that airline shut down in 1982. In addition to hub flights at Syracuse, Empire offered direct flights from other medium-sized Mid-Atlantic cities like Rochester and Buffalo to major business centers like New York and Boston. Empire was named Air Transport World Regional Airline of the Year for 1984.

Empire's success attracted the attention of Piedmont Airlines, a pre-deregulation "local service carrier" based in North Carolina. After deregulation, Piedmont expanded into the Northeast, starting with a hub opened at Baltimore–Washington International Airport in about 1982. Piedmont bought Empire in 1985 and merged them into itself on 1 May 1986, which resulted in additional Fokker F28 jets being added to the Piedmont fleet. Syracuse joined Baltimore (BWI), Charlotte (CLT), and Dayton (DAY), OH as hubs in Piedmont's system. In about 1987, Piedmont opened an extension to the south concourse at Syracuse Hancock Airport to handle additional growth.

The dominant pre-deregulation local-service carrier in the Mid-Atlantic and Northeast, USAir, saw Piedmont's growth into the Northeast as a threat to its lucrative and often previously monopoly routes from medium-size cities such as Rochester, Syracuse and Buffalo. As part of the industry-wide consolidation of 1986–1987, USAir bought Piedmont in 1987. USAir operated Piedmont as a separate unit, including the old Empire Syracuse hub and F28 jets previously operated by Empire and then Piedmont, until Piedmont was completely merged into USAir in August 1989. By the early 1990s the old Empire Airlines hub was gone, its connecting traffic moved mostly to USAir's key hubs in Pittsburgh and Philadelphia, Pennsylvania. USAir subsequently changed its name to US Airways which in turn was merged into American Airlines in 2015.

Destinations served
 New York
Utica (Oneida County Airport)* - hub, later focus city
 Albany (Albany International Airport)
 Binghamton (Broome County Airport)
 Buffalo (Buffalo Niagara International Airport)
 Elmira (Elmira Corning Regional Airport)
 Islip (Long Island MacArthur Airport)
 Ithaca (Tompkins County Airport)
 New York City (John F. Kennedy International Airport & LaGuardia Airport)
 Niagara Falls (Niagara Falls International Airport)
 Rochester (Greater Rochester International Airport)
Rome (Griffiss International Airport)
Syracuse (Syracuse Hancock International Airport) - focus city, later hub
White Plains (Westchester County Airport)
 Connecticut
 Hartford (Bradley International Airport)
Maryland
Baltimore (Baltimore/Washington International Thurgood Marshall Airport)
 Massachusetts
 Boston (Logan International Airport)
 Michigan
 Detroit (Detroit Metropolitan Wayne County Airport)
 New Jersey
 Newark (Newark Liberty International Airport)
 Ohio
 Cleveland (Cleveland Hopkins International Airport)
 Ontario, Canada
 Ottawa (Ottawa Macdonald–Cartier International Airport) 
Quebec, Canada
Montreal, (Montreal-Dorval International Airport)
 Rhode Island
 Providence (T. F. Green Airport)
 Vermont
 Burlington (Burlington International Airport)
 District of Columbia
 Washington, D.C. (Ronald Reagan Washington National Airport)
Those airports marked with an asterisk (*) are no longer served by commercial air service.

Fleet
 Piper Aztec - 1 (1975–1976)
 Piper PA-31 Navajo - 3 (1975–1979)
 Swearingen Metroliner II - 6 (1977–1985)
 Fokker F28 Fellowship - 13 (1980–1986)

See also
 List of defunct airlines of the United States

References

External links

 US Airways: A Heritage Story
 AirTimes.com Timetable History

Companies based in Oneida County, New York
Defunct companies based in Syracuse, New York
Defunct companies based in New York (state)
Economy of the Northeastern United States
Defunct airlines of the United States
Airlines established in 1976
Airlines disestablished in 1985
1976 establishments in New York (state)